Taraknagar is a village in the Krishnaganj CD block in the Krishnanagar Sadar subdivision of the Nadia district, West Bengal, India situated 99 km north of Kolkata. Taraknagar is well connected with the state capital Kolkata via Kolkata Suburban Railway.

Location

The village is located around less than 10 km from Bangladesh–India border.

Education
Literacy rate among the elderly people is quite low here. Taraknagar has two high schools (Taraknagar Ma Maharani High School and Taraknagar Jamuna Sundari High School) three primary schools and one kindergarten. Both the high schools are currently providing Arts subjects after class 10th.

Transport 
Several local trains pass through the Taraknagar railway station situated in Ranaghat - Gede Branch line of Sealdah railway division.

Politics
Taraknagar is situated under Krishnaganj (Vidhan Sabha constituency) and Ranaghat (Lok Sabha constituency). The village falls under Shibnivas Gram Panchayat.

Administration
Krishnanagar is the district headquarter for Shibnivas Gram Panchayat. The Village is Under Krishnanagar Sadar subdivision of Nadia District.

References

Villages in Nadia district